The Midnight Alarm is a 1923 American silent drama film directed by David Smith and starring Alice Calhoun, Percy Marmont, and Cullen Landis.

Plot
As described in a film magazine review, through some peculiar circumstances, Sparkle Carrington becomes a penniless orphan and, while her grandparents search for her, she and another waif run a newstand together. A young crook who loves her and knows of her connections plans to destroy the papers which will identify her, marry her, and get the money. Trapped in a burning building with him, she is rescued by a fire captain who loves her, is restored to her grandparents, and marries the captain.

Cast

References

External links

1923 drama films
Silent American drama films
American silent feature films
1920s English-language films
Vitagraph Studios films
Films directed by David Smith (director)
American black-and-white films
1920s American films